Grevillea uncinulata, also known as hook-leaf grevillea, is a shrub of the genus Grevillea native to an area in the Wheatbelt, southern Mid West, northern Great Southern and western Goldfields-Esperance regions of Western Australia.<ref name=FB>{{FloraBase|name=Grevillea uncinulata|id=2116}}</ref>

Description
It blooms between May and September and produces an axillary or terminal raceme irregular inflorescence with white or cream flowers with white or cream styles.

Taxonomy
The species was first formally described by the botanist Ludwig Diels in 1904 as a part of the work Fragmenta Phytographiae Australiae occidentalis. Beitrage zur Kenntnis der Pflanzen Westaustraliens, ihrer Verbreitung und ihrer Lebensverhaltnisse as published in 'Botanische Jahrbücher für Systematik, Pflanzengeschichte und Pflanzengeographie written by Diels and Ernst Georg Pritzel.
Two synonyms are: Grevillea uncinulata Diels subsp. uncinulata and Grevillea oxystigma var. villosa Benth.

Distribution
The shrub is quite widespread through parts of the Wheatbelt extending from around Carnamah in the north-west down to Cranbrook in the south west out to around Ravensthorpe in the east. It is usually found growing as a part of shrubland communities in sandy to gravelly lateritic soils.

See also
 List of Grevillea species

References

uncinulata
Proteales of Australia
Eudicots of Western Australia
Taxa named by Ludwig Diels
Plants described in 1904